Jack Tony Arthur Burnham (born 18 January 1997) is an English cricketer who previously played for Durham County Cricket Club. Primarily a right-handed batsman, he also bowls right-arm medium. In December 2015 he was named in England's squad for the 2016 Under-19 Cricket World Cup. He was the top run-scorer in the tournament, with 420 runs. In October 2017, he was given a one-year ban from cricket after failing his third drugs test.

References

External links
 
 

1997 births
Living people
English cricketers
Sportspeople from Durham, England
Durham cricketers
Northumberland cricketers
Cricketers from County Durham